Cléverson Maurílio Silva (born 28 December 1969), known as Maurílio, is a Brazilian football manager and former player who played as a forward. He is the current manager of Velo Clube.

Playing career
Maurílio was born in Brasília, Federal District, and began his career with Pinheiros. After his club merged with Colorado to create Paraná in 1990, he moved to the new side and was regularly used before joining Palmeiras in 1992.

Maurílio left Verdão in 1995, but was still linked to the club until 2000. During that period, he represented, always on loan: Paraná, CD Logroñés, Goiás, Santa Cruz, Juventude (two stints), Grêmio, Ponte Preta and Vila Nova. In 2000, he moved to Portuguese Primeira Liga side Vitória de Guimarães, but was released by the club in December.

Maurílio then returned to Paraná for the 2001 campaign, being a regular starter before rescinding his contract in November 2002 to join Al-Ittihad. He returned to the club in June 2003, but failed to settle for a team afterwards. He played for Paysandu, Marília, Ceará, Remo, Fortaleza, São Raimundo-AM, Icasa, Horizonte, Salgueiro, Red Bull Brasil and Uniclinic, retiring with the latter in 2009 at the age of 39.

Managerial career
Shortly after retiring Maurílio started working as a manager, with his first club being Maranguape in 2010. He continued to manage a number of sides in the Northeast Region, notably leading Ferroviário-CE in the 2018 Série D but leaving before the club's title.

On 4 February 2021, after managing ASA, Guarany de Sobral and Itabaiana the previous campaign, Maurílio returned to Paraná as manager for the 2021 season.

Honours

Player
Paraná
Campeonato Paranaense: 1991, 1995
Campeonato Brasileiro Série B: 1992

Palmeiras
Campeonato Brasileiro Série A: 1993, 1994
Campeonato Paulista: 1994
Torneio Rio – São Paulo: 1994

Juventude
Copa do Brasil: 1999

Al-Ittihad
Saudi Premier League: 2002–03

Remo
Campeonato Brasileiro Série C: 2005

Manager
ASA
Copa Alagoas: 2020

References

External links
Futebol de Goyaz profile 

1969 births
Living people
Footballers from Brasília
Brazilian footballers
Association football forwards
Campeonato Brasileiro Série A players
Campeonato Brasileiro Série B players
Paraná Clube players
Sociedade Esportiva Palmeiras players
Goiás Esporte Clube players
Santa Cruz Futebol Clube players
Esporte Clube Juventude players
Grêmio Foot-Ball Porto Alegrense players
Associação Atlética Ponte Preta players
Vila Nova Futebol Clube players
Marília Atlético Clube players
Paysandu Sport Club players
Ceará Sporting Club players
Clube do Remo players
Fortaleza Esporte Clube players
São Raimundo Esporte Clube footballers
Associação Desportiva Recreativa e Cultural Icasa players
Horizonte Futebol Clube players
Salgueiro Atlético Clube players
Red Bull Brasil players
Segunda División players
CD Logroñés footballers
Primeira Liga players
Vitória S.C. players
Brazilian expatriate footballers
Brazilian expatriate sportspeople in Spain
Brazilian expatriate sportspeople in Portugal
Brazilian expatriate sportspeople in Saudi Arabia
Expatriate footballers in Spain
Expatriate footballers in Portugal
Expatriate footballers in Saudi Arabia
Brazilian football managers
Campeonato Brasileiro Série C managers
Campeonato Brasileiro Série D managers
Guarani Esporte Clube (CE) managers
América Futebol Clube (PE) managers
Associação Desportiva Recreativa e Cultural Icasa managers
FC Atlético Cearense managers
Agremiação Sportiva Arapiraquense managers
Rio Branco Sport Club managers
Ferroviário Atlético Clube (CE) managers
Associação Atlética de Altos managers
Sociedade Desportiva Juazeirense managers
Treze Futebol Clube managers
Associação Olímpica de Itabaiana managers
Paraná Clube managers
Associação Esportiva Velo Clube Rioclarense managers